Lorencita Atencio Bird (October 22, 1918 – May 4, 1995), also called T'o Pove ("Flowering Piñon"), was a Pueblo-American painter and textile artist from the Ohkay Owingeh (San Juan) Pueblo. She studied at the Santa Fe Indian School under Dorothy Dunn and exhibited her artwork across the country and in Europe. In particular, she is known for her embroidery designs, utilizing symbolic colors and motifs such as diamonds, butterflies, and the color gold. Her artworks can be found in private collections including the Margretta S. Dietrich Collection and in museums including the Heard Museum, the Gilcrease Museum, the Philbrook Museum of Art, and the Wheelwright Museum of the American Indian.

Atencio was born on October 22, 1918, the daughter of Juan Bautista and Luteria Trujillo Atencio. She was an active watercolor painter and embroidery artist through the 1930s and 1940s, selling her work and earning a living. Some of her paintings depicted subjects going about daily tasks, such as gathering water. In the 1950s, she became the mother of several children and stopped painting as prolifically. She continued to work on weaving and embroidery throughout her life, creating sashes, ceremonial regalia, and wedding attire. Atencio also worked as a crafts instructor at the Santa Fe Indian School and at the U. S. Albuquerque Indian School.

Atencio died on May 4, 1995. She is buried in the Ohkay Owingeh Pueblo Cemetery in Ohkay Awingeh, New Mexico.

References 

1918 births
1995 deaths
20th-century American painters
20th-century indigenous painters of the Americas
Native American painters
Pueblo artists
Painters from New Mexico
American weavers
20th-century women textile artists
20th-century textile artists
American fashion designers
American embroiderers
20th-century Native Americans
Indigenous fashion designers of the Americas
Native American women artists